Daniel Revenu (born 5 December 1942 in Issoundun, Indre, France) is a French fencer and Olympic champion in foil competition, and medalists in four successive Olympics.

Daniel Revenu is the son of French fencing coach Ernest Revenu, from Melun. In the 1960s and 1970s Ernest Revenu trained Olympic, world and national fencing champions - Bruno Boscherie, Bernard Talvard, Hugues Leseur, Daniel Provost, Jacky Courtillat, Frédéric Pietruszka and his own son Daniel.

Daniel Revenu received a gold medal in foil team at the 1968 Summer Olympics in Mexico City, together with Gilles Berolatti, Christian Noël, Jean-Claude Magnan and Jacques Dimont. He participated and received medals at the 1964, 1968, 1972 and 1976 summer Olympics.

References

External links

1942 births
Living people
French male foil fencers
Olympic fencers of France
Fencers at the 1964 Summer Olympics
Fencers at the 1968 Summer Olympics
Fencers at the 1972 Summer Olympics
Fencers at the 1976 Summer Olympics
Olympic gold medalists for France
Olympic bronze medalists for France
Olympic medalists in fencing
Medalists at the 1964 Summer Olympics
Medalists at the 1968 Summer Olympics
Medalists at the 1972 Summer Olympics
Medalists at the 1976 Summer Olympics
Universiade medalists in fencing
Sportspeople from Indre
Universiade bronze medalists for France
Medalists at the 1963 Summer Universiade
Medalists at the 1965 Summer Universiade
Medalists at the 1967 Summer Universiade